Leptosiaphos dungeri is a species of lizard in the family Scincidae. It is found in Nigeria.

References

Leptosiaphos
Reptiles described in 2012
Reptiles of Nigeria
Endemic fauna of Nigeria
Taxa named by Jean-François Trape